The 2020 North Carolina gubernatorial election was held on November 3, 2020, to elect the Governor of North Carolina, concurrently with the 2020 U.S. presidential election, as well as elections to one-third of the United States Senate and elections to the United States House of Representatives and various state and local elections. Incumbent Democratic Governor Roy Cooper was eligible to run for re-election to a second term in office, and announced his intention to do so on December 5,
2019.

Under a 2018 state law, party primary elections were held on March 3, 2020.

Cooper was re-elected to a second term, defeating the Republican nominee, Lieutenant Governor Dan Forest. Cooper's re-election win makes him the first Governor of North Carolina to win re-election since Mike Easley, who was re-elected in 2004. Once again, Cooper outperformed other Democrats on the ballot. With a margin of 4.51%, this election was the second closest of the 2020 gubernatorial election cycle, the closest being the election in Puerto Rico.

Democratic primary

Candidates

Nominee
Roy Cooper, incumbent Governor

Eliminated in primary
Ernest T. Reeves, retired U.S. Army captain and perennial candidate

Polling

Results

Republican primary

Candidates

Nominee
Dan Forest, Lieutenant Governor of North Carolina

Eliminated in primary
Holly Grange, state representative

Declined
Pat McCrory, former Governor of North Carolina
Mark Meadows, former U.S. Representative for North Carolina's 11th congressional district, White House Chief of Staff

Endorsements

Polling

Results

Other candidates

Libertarian Party

Nominee
Steven J. DiFiore, candidate for Charlotte City Council in 2017, factory lighting representative

Constitution Party

Nominee
Al Pisano, chairman of the Constitution Party of North Carolina

General election

Predictions

Endorsements

Debates
A debate between Cooper and Forest occurred 7:00 pm EDT, October 14, 2020.

Polling

with Holly Grange

with Phil Berger

with Pat McCrory

with Tim Moore

with Thom Tillis

Results

By congressional district
Despite winning a majority of the popular vote, Gov. Roy Cooper only won 5 of 13 congressional districts.

See also
 2020 North Carolina elections
 2020 North Carolina lieutenant gubernatorial election

Notes
 Partisan clients

 General

References

External links
  (State affiliate of the U.S. League of Women Voters)
 
 
 

Official campaign websites
 Roy Cooper (D) for Governor
 Steven J. DiFiore (L) for Governor
 Dan Forest (R) for Governor
 Al Pisano (C) for Governor

2020
North Carolina
Governor
North Carolina